Shahid Sattari Expressway (Nur) is from Iranpars Expressway to Tehran-Karaj Freeway.

Expressways in Tehran